Avenida Andrade Corvo (formerly Rua do Corvo) is an avenue in the Plateau of Praia, in the city centre of Praia, Santiago island, Cape Verde. It was named in honour of 19th century Portuguese politician João de Andrade Corvo. It runs south to north in the eastern part of the Plateau, parallel to Rua Serpa Pinto. Its northern end is formed by Praça Luís de Camões.

Notable buildings along the street:
Quartel Jaime Mota, military barracks built in 1872
Presidential Palace of Cape Verde (rear)
Pro-Cathedral of Our Lady of Grace (rear)
Palace of Justice (rear)
townhouse Cor-de-rosa, built at the end of the 19th century

References

Plateau of Praia
Streets in Praia